Johann Ferdinand Hertodt von Todtenfeld (1645–1724) was a German physician and writer, born in the town Nikolsburg, today Mikulov in Moravia.

He is known for his 1671 work Crocologia, entirely devoted to saffron. He was also an alchemical writer, in the Epistolam contra Philalethem, a botanical and geological in Tartaro-Mastix Moraviae (1669), and a medical in Opus mirificum sextae diei (1670).

Notes

External links
 Old dictionary page

1645 births
1724 deaths
German male writers
People from Mikulov
Moravian-German people
German alchemists